State Road 224 (NM 224) is a  state highway in the US state of New Mexico. NM 224's southern terminus is at U.S. Route 60 (US 60) and US 84 east of Melrose, and the northern terminus is at NM 288.

Major intersections

See also

References

224
Transportation in Curry County, New Mexico